The 2018 Hempel Sailing World Championships were held in Aarhus, Denmark, from 30 July to 12 August 2018. It was the fifth edition of the Sailing World Championships. It was the world championships for all disciplines used at the next olympics. Sailors from over 100 nations raced in the waters of the Bay of Aarhus for world championships medals and the possibility to be qualifying for the 2020 Summer Olympics in Tokyo, Japan.

The event took place on the Docklands, at the exact spot where the Vikings founded Aarhus. A new world class sailing centre was the venue for 14 days leaving significant impact on Denmark's sailors and on the further urban development in Aarhus.

Overview
The Sailing World Championships are held every four years, the Worlds is one of the biggest global sailing events in the world. Hempel Sailing World Championships Aarhus 2018 is the first big qualification for the Olympic games in Tokyo 2020. The World Championships included all 10 Olympic boat classes. Kite surfing was added to the programme for the first time. 1,100 sailboats and 1,500 participants from approximately 100 nations are expected to take part in the events. The event expects to draw 400,000 visitors to Aarhus, and more than 800 volunteers.

Bidding process
The following cities competed to win the right to host the Championships.

 Aarhus, Denmark
 Busan, South Korea
 The Hague, Netherlands
 Gdynia, Poland

Venue
Sailing was held on Aarhus Bay with the regatta centre at Navitas Park.

Competition format

Events and equipment
The following events were open for entries:

Competition schedule
The competition started on 2 August and finish on 12 August 2018.

Summary

Medal table

Event medalists

References

External links
Official Event Website
World Sailing website
 

2018
2018
49er & 49er FX World Championships
2018 in sailing
2018 in Danish sport
2018
2018
July 2018 sports events in Europe
August 2018 sports events in Europe